Miss Amapá is a Brazilian Beauty pageant which selects the representative for the State of Amapá at the Miss Brazil contest. The pageant was created in 1958 and has been held every year since with the exception of 1961, 1964-1965, 1967-1968, 1970, 1990, 1993, and 2020. The pageant is held annually with representation of several municipalities. Since 2011, the State director of Miss Amapá is, Enyellen Sales, who is also Miss Amapá 2009. Amapá still has yet to win any crowns in the national contest.

Results Summary

Placements
Miss Brazil: 
1st Runner-Up: 
2nd Runner-Up: 
3rd Runner-Up: 
4th Runner-Up: 
Top 5/Top 8/Top 9: Priscila Winny (2014)
Top 10/Top 11/Top 12: Sandra Ohana (1984); Maria de Oliveira Lopes (1992); Cristiane Valéria Nascimento (1994); Luciana Santos (1999)
Top 15/Top 16:

Special Awards
Miss Congeniality: Patrícia Trindade (2006)
Best State Costume: Carla Helena (2007)

Titleholders

Table Notes

References

External links
Official Miss Brasil Website

Women in Brazil
Amapá
Miss Brazil state pageants